Sidi Boubker is a town in Jerada Province, Oriental, Morocco. According to the 2004 population census, it has a population of 1,878.

References

External links

Rural communes of Oriental (Morocco)
Populated places in Jerada Province